Wapping is a station on the East London line located on the northern bank of the River Thames in Wapping within the London Borough of Tower Hamlets. The station is served by National Rail London Overground services under the control of the London Rail division of Transport for London, however there is no standard red National Rail "double arrow" logo signage located at the station, instead only the Overground roundel.

History

Construction

The station occupies the north end of the former Thames foot tunnel built by Marc Isambard Brunel between 1825 and 1843, and subsequently adapted for railway traffic. Access to the station is by lift or a flight of stairs built into one of the original access shafts of the Thames Tunnel.

London, Brighton and South Coast Railway

London Underground

Underground trains of the Metropolitan and the District Railways first served the station on 1 October 1884, but the station was last served by District trains on 31 July 1905.

In 1980 a London Underground plan to extend the Jubilee line to Woolwich Arsenal and Beckton was approved by parliament. This included a station at Wapping, but was never built. The extension constructed in the 1990s followed a different route to the south of the River Thames.

The station was extensively remodelled between 1995 and 1998, when the entire East London Line—including Wapping station—was closed due to repair work on the tunnels under the Thames. Vitreous enamel panels by Nick Hardcastle, showing the station and the area in former and modern times, were installed on the platforms.

London Overground

The East London Line closed on 22 December 2007, and reopened on 27 April 2010 when it became part of the new London Overground system. During this time the station was heavily refurbished.

The proposed extension of the East London Line raised concerns that the station would have to be closed due to its platforms being too short (only four cars long) to accommodate the new rolling stock planned for the extended line (which could be six or eight cars long). The narrowness of the platforms was also a concern. The station does not fully meet the safety standards for an underground station but is permitted to operate under a derogation from Her Majesty's Railway Inspectorate. Despite this, on 16 August 2004 then-Mayor of London Ken Livingstone announced that the station would remain open.
It is in Travelcard Zone 2.

Services

All times below are correct as of the December 2010 timetables.

London Overground

East London Line

On Mondays to Saturdays there is a service every 5–10 minutes throughout the day, while on Sundays before 13:00 there is a service every 5–9 minutes, changing to every 7–8 minutes until the end of service after that. Current off peak frequency is:

8 northbound to Highbury & Islington
8 northbound to 
4 southbound to  via 
4 southbound to  via 
4 southbound to 
4 southbound to West Croydon via

Connections
London Buses routes 100 and D3 serve the station.

In popular culture
The Wapping railway station features in the 1967 film To Sir, with Love.

References

Bibliography

 

Railway stations in the London Borough of Tower Hamlets
Former East London Railway stations
Railway stations in Great Britain opened in 1869
Railway stations served by London Overground
Railway stations with vitreous enamel panels
Railway station
1869 establishments in England
Railway stations located underground in the United Kingdom
London Overground Night Overground stations